Sir Howard Elphinstone, 2nd Baronet (9 June 1804 – 16 March 1893) was a British Whig politician

He was elected as member of parliament (MP) for Hastings at the 1835 general election, having unsuccessfully contested the seat in 1832. He did not stand for re-election in Hastings at the 1837 general election, but stood instead in Liverpool, where he did not win a seat. He returned to the House of Commons at the 1841 general election, when he won one of the two seats in Lewes. He did not stand again in 1847.

He was elected a Fellow of the Royal Society in June 1832.

Family 
Elphinstone was the son of Lt.-Gen. Sir Howard Elphinstone, 1st Baronet (1773–1846) and Frances Warburton (died 1858). He was a barrister, and had the degrees of MA and Doctor of Civil Law (D.C.L.). He married Elizabeth Julia Curteis, in 1829, and they had two children.

He succeeded to his father's baronetcy in 1846, and on his death was succeeded by his son Howard Warburton Elphinstone (1830–1917).

References

External links 
 

1804 births
1893 deaths
Baronets in the Baronetage of the United Kingdom
Whig (British political party) MPs for English constituencies
Members of the Parliament of the United Kingdom for English constituencies
UK MPs 1835–1837
UK MPs 1841–1847
Fellows of the Royal Society
Committee members of the Society for the Diffusion of Useful Knowledge